Challenge was the tenth and final Bulldog Drummond novel written by H. C. McNeile. It was published in 1935 under McNeile's pen name Sapper.

References

Bibliography

 

1937 British novels
British crime novels
English novels
Hodder & Stoughton books